This is a list of companies in digital therapeutics, a healthcare discipline that utilizes digital and Internet-based health technologies to make behavioral and lifestyle changes in patients. Digital therapeutics is a relatively new discipline that uses digital implements like mobile devices, apps, sensors, the Internet of Things, and others to spur behavioral changes in patients. The methodology operates as both a preventative technique for at-risk patients and a treatment for patients with existing conditions. The companies in this list are organized by the health conditions or functions on which they focus.

Companies

Diabetes, obesity, and heart disease
 
Glooko produces a software for diabetes patients that also uses Internet-connected insulin pumps and blood glucose meters to collect data.
Omada Health produces a program called "Prevent" that provides patients with health coaching, support groups, and education  for preventing type 2 diabetes, heart disease, and obesity.

Fitness 

 MyFitnessPal

Digital Physical Therapy 

 Sword Health

References
 

Health information technology companies
Medical lists